Anthony Velarde (born March 8, 1996) is an American professional soccer player who plays as a midfielder.

Career

Pittsburgh Riverhounds
On January 14, 2019, Veldare signed with USL Championship side Pittsburgh Riverhounds.

Central Valley Fuego
On January 4, 2022, Velarde become the first ever player for Central Valley Fuego ahead of their inaugural season in USL League One.

References

External links

Profile at Fresno Pacific Athletics

1996 births
Living people
American soccer players
Association football midfielders
Fresno Fuego players
Fresno Pacific Sunbirds men's soccer players
People from Reedley, California
Pittsburgh Riverhounds SC players
Soccer players from California
Sportspeople from Fresno County, California
USL Championship players
USL League Two players
Central Valley Fuego FC players
USL League One players